Martín Quirós Palau (27 April 1929 – 17 February 2022) was a Spanish politician.

A member of the People's Party, he served in the Corts Valencianes from 1991 to 2002. He died in Valencia on 17 February 2022, at the age of 92.

References

1929 births
2022 deaths
People's Party (Spain) politicians
Members of the 3rd Corts Valencianes
Members of the 4th Corts Valencianes
Members of the 5th Corts Valencianes
Politicians from the Valencian Community